Manoj Kumar (born 10 December 1986), is an Indian boxer who won a gold medal in the light welterweight division at the 2010 Commonwealth Games. He hails from the village of Rajound in the Kaithal district of Haryana.

Early life and debut in boxing
Kumar was born on 10 December 1986 in Rajound village, 30 km from Kaithal, Haryana and comes from a Ror family. His father Sher Singh retired from the Indian Army, while his mother is a housewife. Manoj Kumar initially started his career as an athlete, while his elder brother Rajesh Kumar Rajound was an emerging boxer. When Rajesh Kumar Rajound won gold in the University championship he was expecting to be selected for the national team. However he was ignored, and therefore decided to bring his younger brother into boxing.  He started to coach Manoj Kumar and also insisted his younger brother Mukesh Kumar change from judo to boxing to become a sparring partner of Manoj Kumar. All three travelled from their village Rajound to Kaithal to train. In the early days they trained with the help of old bicycle tubes.

Manoj Kumar became national Champion for the first time when he beat defending champion Som Bahadur Pun in 2008. After that Manoj never looked back. He won the gold medal at the 2010 Commonwealth Games.

Career

Commonwealth Games 2010
 Won against D Lassayo (Sierra Leone)
 Won against G Gaasite (Botswana)
 Won against B Mathenge of Kenya in the quarters
 Won 3–1 against V Knowles of Bahamas in a low scoring semifinal
 Won 11–2 against Bradley Saunders of England in the final and became champion.

2011 World Amateur Boxing Championships
Kumar reached the quarterfinals, losing 18–24 to Tom Stalker, at the 2011 World Amateur Boxing Championships in Baku, Azerbaijan. Earlier in the competition, Kumar had defeated Valentino Knowles of Bahamas 17–11, Ray Moylette of Ireland 19–7 and Hu Qing of China 17–15. This last victory against Hu Qing had sealed his qualification for the 2012 Olympic Games.

London Olympics 2012
Manoj won the first round against Serdar Hudayberdiyev of Turkmenistan by a score of 13–7 and advanced to the last 16. But he lost his pre-quarterfinal bout against world #1 ranked Tom Stalker of Great Britain. The final score read 20–16, the break-up being 7–4, 9–5, 4–7 in the favor of Stalker. Expressing disapproval at the second round scoring, Manoj cited "blatant cheating" as the reason for his defeat as he exited the competition.

2014 Commonwealth Games 
At the 2014 Commonwealth Games he reached the quarterfinals before losing to Sam Maxwell.

2016 South Asian Games 
In 2016 South Asian Games held in Guwahati, Manoj Kumar wins gold medal in his weight category.

2018 India Open International Boxing Tournament 
In 2018, India Open International Boxing Tournament held in Delhi, Manoj Kumar wins bronze medal in his weight category.

Awards
He was awarded Arjuna Award by Government of India in 2014. Initially he was not considered for Arjuna Award by the selection committee headed by former Indian Cricket Team Captain Kapil Dev. However, his coach Rajesh Kumar Rajound file a case against the selection committee on 26 August 2014 in Delhi High Court. Rajesh claimed that Manoj was the most deserving sports person for the Arjuna Award and that the selection committee ignored him. Delhi High Court accepted his petition and after seeing all the facts directed the government to honor Manoj Kumar with the "Arjuna Award".

He won the bronze at Commonwealth Games 2018

References

Boxers at the 2010 Commonwealth Games
Commonwealth Games gold medallists for India
Indian male boxers
Living people
1986 births
Light-welterweight boxers
People from Kaithal district
Boxers from Haryana
Boxers at the 2012 Summer Olympics
Boxers at the 2016 Summer Olympics
Olympic boxers of India
Boxers at the 2006 Asian Games
Boxers at the 2014 Commonwealth Games
Boxers at the 2014 Asian Games
Commonwealth Games medallists in boxing
Boxers at the 2018 Asian Games
South Asian Games gold medalists for India
Asian Games competitors for India
South Asian Games medalists in boxing
Recipients of the Arjuna Award
Medallists at the 2010 Commonwealth Games